Excelsior is the name of several unincorporated communities in the U.S. state of West Virginia.

Excelsior, McDowell County, West Virginia
Excelsior, Upshur County, West Virginia
Excelsior, Webster County, West Virginia